Interpol (known in the U.S. as Pickup Alley) is a 1957 British Warwick Films crime film noir shot in CinemaScope and starring Victor Mature, Anita Ekberg, Trevor Howard, Bonar Colleano and Sid James. It concerns an Interpol effort to stamp out a major drug-smuggling cartel in numerous countries. Mature plays an American narcotics officer, with Howard as a drug baron. One review described the film as a "feeble thriller," although it praised Howard's performance.

In the United States, the film was released as a double feature with The Brothers Rico.

Plot

Charles Sturgis is an FBI agent on the trail of a drug-smuggling operation. The crazed criminal mastermind Frank McNally has strangled Sturgis' sister to death. Gina Broger is Frank's beautiful courier.

Cast
 Victor Mature as Charles Sturgis
 Anita Ekberg as Gina Broger
 Trevor Howard as Frank McNally
 Bonar Colleano as Amalio
 Dorothy Alison as Helen
 André Morell as Commissioner Breckner
 Martin Benson as Captain Varolli
 Eric Pohlmann as Etienne Fayala
 Peter Illing as Captain Baris
 Sydney Tafler as Curtis
 Lionel Murton as Murphy
 Danny Green as Second Bartender
 Alec Mango as Salko
 Sid James as Joe as First Bartender
 Marne Maitland as Guido Martinelli
 Harold Kasket as Kalish

Production
The film was produced by Warwick Productions, who had previously released Zarak, also starring Victor Mature and Anita Ekberg. Michael Wilding was originally announced for the role later played by Trevor Howard.

The story was based on the files of the International Criminal Police Commission. Filming began on 15 August 1956 and took place in New York, Paris, Rome, Genoa (Italy), Madrid, London and Athens.

See also
 List of British films of 1957

References

External links
 
 
 
 
 

1957 films
1957 crime drama films
Films shot at Associated British Studios
Films directed by John Gilling
Columbia Pictures films
CinemaScope films
British black-and-white films
British crime drama films
Films about the illegal drug trade
Films scored by Richard Rodney Bennett
Films set in Athens
Films set in Lisbon
Films set in Naples
Films set in Rome
British drama films
1950s English-language films
1950s British films